Saltire Scholarship is a scholarship offered by Government of Scotland for study in Scotland for period of one year.

Eligible countries
Following are eligible countries:
 Canada
 China
 India
 Japan
 Pakistan
 United States

References

Scholarships in Scotland
Higher education in Scotland
Government scholarships